Modou Lamin Jadama (born 17 March 1994) is a Gambian footballer who plays as a centre back for Hartford Athletic in the USL Championship.

He made his professional debut for Colo-Colo against Santiago Wanderers in February 2015 for the Santo Tomás Cup, which his team won by penalties. He has played 92 minutes in two matches of the 2015 Copa Chile of his young career.

Jadama signed with Hartford Athletic of the USL Championship on January 24, 2022.

References

External links 
 ESPN Profile
 

1994 births
Living people
American soccer players
American expatriate sportspeople in Chile
Colo-Colo footballers
Coquimbo Unido footballers
Hartford Athletic players
FC Tulsa players
Portland Timbers players
Portland Timbers 2 players
Atlanta United 2 players
Chilean Primera División players
USL Championship players
Expatriate footballers in Chile
African-American soccer players
American people of Gambian descent
American sportspeople of African descent
Sportspeople of Gambian descent
Soccer players from Atlanta
Association football defenders
Gambian footballers
Major League Soccer players
21st-century African-American sportspeople